Christoph Harting (born 10 April 1990) is a German athlete specialising in the discus throw.  He won the gold medal at the 2016 Summer Olympics in Rio de Janeiro. He competed at the 2013 and 2015 World Championships, reaching the final on the second occasion.

He is the younger brother of multiple-time world champion and fellow Olympic gold medalist Robert Harting.

International competitions

References

External links 
 
 
 
 
 
 

1990 births
Living people
German male discus throwers
Sportspeople from Cottbus
World Athletics Championships athletes for Germany
Athletes (track and field) at the 2016 Summer Olympics
Olympic athletes of Germany
Olympic gold medalists for Germany
Medalists at the 2016 Summer Olympics
Olympic gold medalists in athletics (track and field)
Olympic male discus throwers